Demachy is a French surname. Notable people with the surname include:

François Demachy, French perfumer
Pierre-Antoine Demachy (1723–1807), French artist
Robert Demachy (1859–1936), French photographer

See also
Le Sieur de Machy, 17th-century French musician

French-language surnames